Xyris baldwiniana, common name Baldwin's yelloweyed grass, is a North American species of flowering plant in the yellow-eyed-grass family. It is native to southern Mexico (Chiapas), Central America (Belize, Honduras, Nicaragua), and the southeastern and south-central United States (from Texas to North Carolina).

Xyris baldwiniana is a perennial herb up to 50 cm (20 inches) tall with grass-like leaves and yellow flowers.

References

External links
Photo of herbarium specimen at Missouri Botanical Garden, collected in Nicaragua in 1982

baldwiniana
Plants described in 1822
Flora of the Southern United States
Flora of Chiapas
Flora of Central America